Antwone Savage (born March 29, 1981) is a former American football wide receiver in the Arena Football League. He played for the Spokane Shock, Oklahoma City Yard Dawgz, and the Albany Panthers. He played college football for the Oklahoma Sooners.

References

1981 births
Living people
American football wide receivers
Oklahoma Sooners football players
South Georgia Wildcats players
Spokane Shock players
Oklahoma City Yard Dawgz players
Albany Panthers players
Sportspeople from Albany, Georgia